Membership of the National Academy of Sciences is an award granted to scientists that the National Academy of Sciences (NAS) of the United States judges to have made “distinguished and continuing achievements in original research”. Membership is a mark of excellence in science and one of the highest honors that a scientist can receive.

NAS members and international members 

Three types of NAS membership exist:

 Voting members, who must hold citizenship of the United States 
 Nonvoting international members, who have citizenship outside the United States 
 Emeritus members, who are no longer active and have rescinded their voting rights
 there were 2,382 active members and  484 international members, of whom approximately 190 have received Nobel Prizes. A full list of members can be found in the online members directory. See the list of members of the National Academy of Sciences and :Category:Members of the United States National Academy of Sciences for examples.

Notable member firsts 
Some notable member firsts and records include:
 Edward C. Pickering (1846–1919) was the youngest scientist elected,  only 26 years old at the time of his election in 1873
 Florence R. Sabin (1871–1953) was the first woman to be elected a member in 1924
 David Blackwell (1919–2010) was the first African American elected in 1965
 Marcia McNutt was the first woman to serve as president of the NAS, following her election as a member in 2005.
 Ben Barres (1954–2017) was the first transgender scientist elected in 2013
 Frances Arnold was the first woman to be elected to all three National Academies in the United States – the National Academy of Engineering (NAE, 2000), the National Academy of Medicine (NAM, 2004) and the National Academy of Sciences (NAS, 2008)
 Richard Feynman resigned his NAS membership because of what he perceived as the Academy's elitism and in-group favoritism. Feynman outlines the reasons for his resignation in his published correspondence Perfectly Reasonable Deviations from the Beaten Track. Though arguably the most famous, Feynman was not alone.  Richard Lewontin also resigned for principled reasons (as opposed, say, to ill-health) in 1972, and Josiah Whitney was the first member to resign, in 1874.

Member diversity 
Critics have pointed to a lack of member diversity because of a selection bias for  “old white men” who dominate membership of the Academy. Elite institutions such as the from Ivy League, MIT, Stanford, the University of California and Caltech also dominate membership, thereby perpetuating the Matthew effect. Diversity of age, disability, race, religion, gender and sexual orientation is lower in NAS than in the general population. For example, women in science are an underrepresented group in the Academy but the proportion of female members is slowly growing.
 In 1989, the academy had just 57 female members and 1,516 male members (3% female in total) 
 In 2010, there were 14 newly elected women (19% new female inductees) from 72 new members 
 In 2011, there were only 9 women (12% new female inductees) from 72 newly elected members. 
 In 2012, the Academy elected 84 new members, with a record high of 26 women (30% new female inductees)
 In 2019, 50 women out of 125 new members were female (40% of new female inductees), another record high although the proportion of women in the academy as a whole is much lower than 40%

Persons of color have also been reported as underrepresented.

Nomination and election of new members 
New members and international members have been elected annually since 1863. Membership can not be applied for as only voting academicians can submit formal nominations for newly elected members, for
preferential voting in an annual ballot of members every March. Candidates for membership are considered by peer review and voted for again through several rounds of balloting and a final annual ballot in April at the annual general meeting (AGM) of the academy with results announced shortly after, usually early May. Each nomination includes a curriculum vitae (CV) with a 250 word summary of the nominee's scientific achievements, the basis for election and a list of no more than 12 of their most important papers published in scientific journals. The publication limit of 12 aims to focus assessment on the quality of a nominee's work, rather than the quantity of publications.

, a maximum of 100 members may be elected annually. Non-citizens of the USA are elected as international members, with a maximum of 25 elected annually. Both members and international members are affiliated with one of six scientific disciplines:

 Physical science and mathematical sciences
 Biological sciences
 Engineering and applied sciences
 Biomedical sciences
 Behavioural sciences and social sciences
 Applied Biological, agricultural science and environmental sciences

On election, members are invited to an annual awards ceremony.

Member biographies 
Since 1966, newly elected members of the National Academy of Sciences have been invited to contribute an inaugural year article (IYA) to Proceedings of the National Academy of Sciences of the United States of America (PNAS) which is accompanied by a brief biography of the author. Biographies of deceased members are published in the Biographical Memoirs of the National Academy of Sciences (BMNAS), for example see David Arnett's biography of Alastair G. W. Cameron.

References 

Academic awards
United States National Academy of Sciences
United States National Academies